Song of the Gringo is a 1936 American Western film directed by John P. McCarthy. The film is also known as The Old Corral in the United Kingdom. The film was the debut of singing cowboy Tex Ritter. It was co-written by former outlaw and judge Al Jennings who appears as a judge in the film.

Plot
An undercover Texas Ranger infiltrates a hacienda to identify and bring to justice a gang using murder to steal mineral mines.

Cast 
Tex Ritter as Tex
Joan Woodbury as Lolita Maria Dolores Del Valle
Fuzzy Knight as Slim Zony
Monte Blue as Sheriff
Ted Adams as Evans
Warner Richmond as Henchman 'Cherokee'
Al J. Jennings as Judge
Martin Garralaga as Don Esteban Valle
William Desmond as Bailiff
Forrest Taylor as Prosecuting Attorney
Robert Fiske as Defense Attorney
Rosa Rey as Rosita (the maid)
 José Pacheco as Orchestra Leader

Soundtrack 
 "Out on the Old Prairie" (by Tex Ritter)
 "My Sweet Chiquita" (by Tex Ritter)
 "Sam Hall" (by Tex Ritter)
 " Rye Whiskey" (by Tex Ritter)
 "You Are Reality" (Written by Joan Woodbury)

External links 
 
 
 

1936 films
1930s English-language films
American black-and-white films
1936 Western (genre) films
Grand National Films films
American Western (genre) films
Films directed by Robert Emmett Tansey
1930s American films